In elementary algebra, a trinomial is a polynomial consisting of three terms or monomials.

Examples of trinomial expressions
  with  variables
  with  variables
  with  variables 
 , the quadratic form in standard form with  variables. 
  with  variables,  nonnegative integers and  any constants.
  where  is variable and constants  are nonnegative integers and  any constants.

Trinomial equation
A trinomial equation is a polynomial equation involving three terms. An example is the equation  studied by Johann Heinrich Lambert in the 18th century.

Some notable trinomials 

 The quadratic trinomial in standard form (as from above):
 
 sum or difference of two cubes:
 
 A special type of trinomial can be factored in a manner similar to quadratics since it can be viewed as a quadratic in a new variable ( below). This form is factored as:
 
where
 
.
The same result can be provided by Ruffini's rule, but with a more complex and time-consuming process.

See also
Trinomial expansion
Monomial
Binomial
Multinomial
Simple expression
Compound expression
Sparse polynomial

Notes

References

Elementary algebra
Polynomials